Virginia's first congressional district is a United States congressional district in the commonwealth of Virginia. 

Virginia politicians sometimes refer to it as "America's First District" since it includes the Historic Triangle of Jamestown,  Williamsburg, and Yorktown. In the 18th and early 19th century, it comprised northwestern Virginia (that became Frederick County, Virginia as well as the Eastern Panhandle of West Virginia after the American Civil War). The district includes major military installations and has been represented by Republican Rob Wittman since 2007.

2016 redistricting
In 2016, the adjacent 3rd district was ruled unconstitutional. New districts have been drawn.

Recent results in statewide elections 
Results Under Current Lines (Since 2023)

Results Under Old Lines

Area covered
Starting in 2023, the first district will cover all or part of the following political subdivisions:

Counties
Chesterfield
Essex
Gloucester
Hanover
Henrico
James City
King and Queen
King William
Lancaster
Mathews
Middlesex
New Kent
Northumberland
Richmond County
Westmoreland
York

Cities
The entirety of:
Poquoson
Williamsburg

Historic district boundaries

The Virginia First District started in 1788 covering the counties of Berkeley, Frederick, Hampshire, Hardy, Harrison, Monongalia, Ohio, Randolph and Shenandoah. Of these only Shenandoah and Frederick Counties are in Virginia today; the rest are now part of West Virginia. The modern counties of Clarke, Warren and most of Page as well as the independent city of Winchester were included as part of Frederick and Shenandoah counties in 1788. In West Virginia all the current state north and east of a generalized line running from Wood County to Pocahontas County was in the congressional district. The one exception was that Pendleton County, West Virginia was in Virginia's 3rd congressional district.

In the redistribution which followed the 1850 census (in force 1853–1863), the First District comprised sixteen counties in eastern Virginia. The counties included (amongst others) Accomack, Essex, Gloucester, James City, King and Queen, Mathews, Middlesex, New Kent, Richmond, Warwick and Westmoreland. In an 1862 Union special election three out of the sixteen counties in the Union district supplied returns.

The First District is noted for its strong presence of military institutions, including the Naval Surface Warfare Center. Increasing numbers of military and retired voters have swung the district to the right.

Recent election results

List of members representing the district

See also

Virginia's congressional districts
List of United States congressional districts
2007 Virginia's 1st congressional district special election

References

 Congressional Biographical Directory of the United States 1774–present

01
Constituencies established in 1789
1789 establishments in Virginia
Constituencies disestablished in 1933
1933 disestablishments in Virginia
Constituencies established in 1935
1935 establishments in Virginia